Hrvatska Dubica is a village and a municipality in central Croatia in the Sisak-Moslavina County. It is located on the northern bank of the river Una, east of Hrvatska Kostajnica and southwest of Jasenovac and Novska. The town of Bosanska Dubica lies to the south of the municipality, in Bosnia and Herzegovina. Hrvatska Dubica is underdeveloped municipality which is statistically classified as the First Category Area of Special State Concern by the Government of Croatia.

Demographics
The municipality of Hrvatska Dubica has a population of 2,089 (2011 census), 75.30% (1,573) which are Croats and 22.40% (468) which are Serbs.

Settlements

 Baćin, population 217
 Donji Cerovljani, population 76
 Gornji Cerovljani, population 99
 Hrvatska Dubica, population 1,040
 Slabinja, population 348
 Živaja, population 309

Recent history
During the Croatian War of Independence, Hrvatska Dubica was located in the area contested by Serb rebels. Most of the civilians fled the area during the attacks of the Serbian forces that started in September 1991. These forces were controlled by Milan Martić, and consisted of units of Yugoslav People's Army, Territorial Defence, and the so-called Militia of SAO Krajina. Hrvatska Dubica fell on 17 September 1991. Around 7 October 1991, Serb forces took control of the entire wider area of Hrvatska Kostajnica. Most Croats fled the area or were killed by Serb forces during a subsequent campaign of ethnic cleansing, which included the infamous Baćin massacre.

Notable people

 Mirko Braun (1942–2004), Croatian association football player.
 Ivo Kozarčanin (1911–1941), Croatian writer, poet and literary critic.

See also 

 Battle of Dubica
 List of Knights Templar sites
 Újlaki family

References

External links 
 

 
Populated places in Sisak-Moslavina County
Bosnia and Herzegovina–Croatia border crossings
Municipalities of Croatia